Bring It on Home is a covers album by Joan Osborne, released under Saguaro Road Records on March 27, 2012. It was her first album in five years. The record is co-produced with guitarist Jack Petruzzelli and consists entirely of blues and R&B covers. The album also includes tracks originally made famous by American blues masters, such as Sonny Boy Williamson ("Bring It on Home"), Muddy Waters ("I Want to Be Loved"), as well as recordings originally released by some of the best-known R&B performers, including Ray Charles ("I Don’t Need No Doctor"), Al Green ("Rhymes"), and Otis Redding ("Champagne and Wine").

The first single was "Shake Your Hips", released in January 2012 on iTunes. Osborne toured to support her album in March 2012 and was slated to do so again in the spring of 2013. Bring It on Home was nominated for a 2013 Grammy award in the Blues category.

Track listing

Reception
The album was generally well received. Reviewer Steve Pick at About.com wrote: "Joan Osborne just gets better and better as a song interpreter, and this collection of blues and R&B just might be her finest recording to date." Thom Jurek was even more positive, writing at Allmusic, "This isn't a reverential recording; it's authoritative; she makes these songs her own. Bring It on Home carries Osborne's mature voice in a way that's never been heard from her before. Her abilities as an interpretive singer prove her an extension of these [blues and R&B] traditions, not merely a torch bearer for them."

References

Joan Osborne albums
2012 albums
Covers albums